The Portugal national wheelchair handball team is the national wheelchair handball team of Portugal and is controlled by the Portuguese Handball Federation. The Portugal become at the only two editions of the European Wheelchair Handball Nations' Tournament second.

Competitive record

European Wheelchair Handball Nations' Tournament

References

External links 
Handball Federation of Portugal Team Page
EHF Team Page

National wheelchair handball teams
Handball in Portugal
National sports teams of Portugal